Edward Banks may refer to:
 Edward Banks (architect) (1817–1866), English architect
 Edward Banks (builder) (1769–1835), British civil engineer who built several of London's bridges
 Edward Banks (cricketer) (1820–1910), Welsh-born English cricketer
 Edward Banks (naturalist) (1903–1988), British administrator, amateur naturalist and museum curator
 Edward Banks (politician) (1836–1883), Hamburg lawyer and politician
 Edward Banks (Syndicus) (1796–1851), Syndicus of the Free City of Hamburg
 Eddie Banks, fictional character in defunct British soap opera, Brookside
 Ned Banks, fictional character in television drama, Ghost Whisperer